The men's 400 metres hurdles event at the 2015 African Games was held on 15 and 16 September.

Medalists

Results

Heats
Qualification: First 3 in each heat (Q) and the next 2 fastest (q) advanced to the final.

Final

References

400